Collagraphy (sometimes spelled collography) is a printmaking process introduced in 1955 by Glen Alps in which materials are applied to a rigid substrate (such as paperboard or wood). The word is derived from the Greek word koll or kolla, meaning glue, and graph, meaning the activity of drawing.

The plate can be intaglio-inked, inked with a roller or paintbrush or some combination thereof. Ink or pigment is applied to the resulting collage and the board is used to print onto paper or another material using either a printing press or various hand tools. The resulting print is termed a collagraph. Substances such as carborundum, acrylic texture mediums, sandpapers, textiles, bubble wrap, string or other fibres, cut card, leaves and grass can all be used in creating the collagraph plate. In some instances, leaves can be used as a source of pigment by rubbing them onto the surface of the plate.

Different tonal effects and vibrant colours can be achieved with the technique due to the depth of relief and differential inking that results from the collagraph plate's highly textured surface. Collagraphy is a very open printmaking method. Ink may be applied to the upper surfaces of the plate with a brayer for a relief print, or ink may be applied to the entire board and then removed from the upper surfaces but remain in the spaces between objects, resulting in an intaglio print. A combination of both intaglio and relief methods may also be employed. A printing press may or may not be used.

Donald Stoltenberg, well known for his use of the technique in the New England art community, authored an educational text in 1975, titled Collagraph Printmaking.

See also
Carborundum printmaking
 Artist: Donald Hugo Stoltenberg https://en.m.wikipedia.org/wiki/Donald_Stoltenberg

References

 
 
 
 
 

Printmaking